Bravo maestro is a 1978 Yugoslavian drama film directed by Rajko Grlić. It was entered into the 1978 Cannes Film Festival.

Plot
Vitomir Bezjak graduated from the Academy of Music in Zagreb near the top of his class. After graduation, he lives a bohemian lifestyle, working on his compositions while unsuccessfully looking for a source of income. After his girlfriend leaves him, he reluctantly takes up a job as a piano teacher. He falls in love and marries a rich widow whose son he has been teaching. After her father introduces him to a number of influential people, Bezjak's life dramatically changes: he becomes a household name and starts to appear in various meetings and events, gradually gaining political influence. As he drifts away from the musical world, it becomes apparent he is no longer the talented young man he used to be. When his long-awaited major orchestral work is performed for the first time, he gets accused of plagiarism, and a scandal erupts.

Cast
 Rade Šerbedžija - Vitomir Bezjak
 Aleksandar Berček - Tomo
 Božidar Boban - Jaksa Radic
 Mladen Budiščak - Mladen
 Koraljka Hrs - Iva Budic
 Ante Vican - Ivin otac Mate
 Zvonko Lepetić - Vinko Katunic
 Ivo Jurisa - Ivan
 Radojka Šverko - Roza
 Izet Hajdarhodžić - Blagoje Boric
 Angel Palasev - Stanko Miric
 Zlata Petković - Sonja
 Marjeta Gregorac - (as Marieta Gregorac)
 Marija Kohn - Cistacica
 Kostadinka Velkovska
 Petar Dobrić
 Branko Cvejić - Predsjednik savjeta
 Vladimir Krstulović - (as Vlado Krstulovic)
 Neda Ritz
 Pero Zlatar

References

External links

1978 films
Yugoslav drama films
Serbo-Croatian-language films
1978 drama films
Films directed by Rajko Grlić
Jadran Film films
Films about music and musicians